Abshire is a surname.  People with it include:

 Ariel Abshire (born 1991), American singer/songwriter
 Brian Abshire (born 1963), American long-distance runner
 David Manker Abshire (1926–2014), American diplomat and political figure
 Nathan Abshire (1913–1981), American Cajun accordion player

References